Ben Kutchins is an American cinematographer.

Biography
Kutchins started his career with an internship at Industrial Light & Magic (ILM), rising to production assistant. Next he studied film at the New York University Tisch School of the Arts, then shot about 60 short films in two years, before working on indie films and was then hired to shoot the film Veronica Mars followed by the Amazon series, Mozart in the Jungle.

He has been nominated twice for a Primetime Emmy Award for Outstanding Cinematography for a Single-Camera Series (One Hour) for his work on Ozark, in 2018 and 2020.

Selected cinematography

Film
Bomb the System, 2002
The Best Thief in the World, 2004
The Fifth Patient, 2007
Holy Rollers, 2010
The Art of Getting By, 2011
Why Stop Now, 2012
Lucky Them, 2013
The Longest Week, 2014
Veronica Mars, 2014
Sleeping with Other People, 2015
Soaked in Bleach, 2015
Ten Thousand Saints, 2015
Crown Heights, 2017
Jexi, 2019
Photograph, 2019
Clouds, 2020
Boston Strangler, 2023

Television
Ozark, 2018-2020
The Dangerous Book for Boys, 2018
The White Lotus, 2021

References

Living people
American cinematographers
Tisch School of the Arts alumni
Industrial Light & Magic people
Year of birth missing (living people)